The Booker Prize, formerly known as the Booker Prize for Fiction (1969–2001) and the Man Booker Prize (2002–2019), is a literary prize awarded each year for the best novel written in English and published in the United Kingdom or Ireland. The winner of the Booker Prize receives international publicity which usually leads to a sales boost. When the prize was created, only novels written by Commonwealth, Irish, and South African (and later Zimbabwean) citizens were eligible to receive the prize; in 2014 it was widened to any English-language novel—a change that proved controversial. 

A five-person panel constituted by authors, librarians, literary agents, publishers, and booksellers is appointed by the Booker Prize Foundation each year to choose the winning book.

A high-profile literary award in British culture, the Booker Prize is greeted with anticipation and fanfare. Literary critics have noted that it is a mark of distinction for authors to be selected for inclusion in the shortlist or to be nominated for the "longlist".

A sister prize, the International Booker Prize, is awarded for a book translated into English and published in the United Kingdom or Ireland. The £50,000 prize money is split evenly between the author and translator of the winning novel.

History and administration
The prize was established as the Booker Prize for Fiction after the company Booker, McConnell Ltd began sponsoring the event in 1969; it became commonly known as the "Booker Prize" or the "Booker".

When administration of the prize was transferred to the Booker Prize Foundation in 2002, the title sponsor became the investment company Man Group, which opted to retain "Booker" as part of the official title of the prize.  The foundation is an independent registered charity funded by the entire profits of Booker Prize Trading Ltd, of which it is the sole shareholder. The prize money awarded with the Booker Prize was originally £5,000. It doubled in 1978 to £10,000 and was subsequently raised to £50,000 in 2002 under the sponsorship of the Man Group, making it one of the world's richest literary prizes. Each of the shortlisted authors receives £2,500 and a specially bound edition of their book. 

The original Booker Prize trophy was designed by the artist Jan Pieńkowski.

1969–1979
The first winner of the Booker Prize was P. H. Newby in 1969 for his novel Something to Answer For. The inaugural set of five judges included Rebecca West, W.L. Webb, Stephen Spender, Frank Kermode and David Farrer.

In 1970, Bernice Rubens became the first woman to win the Booker Prize, for The Elected Member. The rules of the Booker changed in 1971; previously, it had been awarded retrospectively to books published prior to the year in which the award was given.  In 1971 the year of eligibility was changed to the same as the year of the award; in effect, this meant that books published in 1970 were not considered for the Booker in either year. The Booker Prize Foundation announced in January 2010 the creation of a special award called the "Lost Man Booker Prize", with the winner chosen from a longlist of 22 novels published in 1970.

Alice Munro's The Beggar Maid was shortlisted in 1980, and remains the only short story collection to be shortlisted.

John Sutherland, who was a judge for the 1999 prize, has said:

In 1972, winning writer John Berger, known for his Marxist worldview, protested during his acceptance speech against Booker McConnell. He blamed Booker's 130 years of sugar production in the Caribbean for the region's modern poverty. Berger donated half of his £5,000 prize to the British Black Panther movement, because it had a socialist and revolutionary perspective in agreement with his own.

1980–1999

In 1980, Anthony Burgess, writer of Earthly Powers, refused to attend the ceremony unless it was confirmed to him in advance whether he had won. His was one of two books considered likely to win, the other being Rites of Passage by William Golding. The judges decided only 30 minutes before the ceremony, giving the prize to Golding. Both novels had been seen as favourites to win leading up to the prize, and the dramatic "literary battle" between two senior writers made front-page news.

In 1981, nominee John Banville wrote a letter to The Guardian requesting that the prize be given to him so that he could use the money to buy every copy of the longlisted books in Ireland and donate them to libraries, "thus ensuring that the books not only are bought but also read – surely a unique occurrence".

Judging for the 1983 award produced a draw between J. M. Coetzee's Life & Times of Michael K and Salman Rushdie's Shame, leaving chair of judges Fay Weldon to choose between the two. According to Stephen Moss in The Guardian, "Her arm was bent and she chose Rushdie", only to change her mind as the result was being phoned through.

In 1992, the jury split the prize between Michael Ondaatje's The English Patient and Barry Unsworth's Sacred Hunger. This prompted the foundation to draw up a rule that made it mandatory for the appointed jury to make the award to just a single author/book.

In 1993, two of the judges threatened to walk out when Trainspotting appeared on the longlist; Irvine Welsh's novel was pulled from the shortlist to satisfy them. The novel would later receive critical acclaim, and is now considered Welsh's masterpiece.

The choice of James Kelman's book How Late It Was, How Late as 1994 Booker Prize winner proved to be one of the most controversial in the award's history. Rabbi Julia Neuberger, one of the judges, declared it "a disgrace" and left the event, later deeming the book to be "crap"; WHSmith's marketing manager called the award "an embarrassment to the whole book trade"; Waterstones in Glasgow sold a mere 13 copies of Kelman's book the following week. In 1994, The Guardians literary editor Richard Gott, citing the lack of objective criteria and the exclusion of American authors, described the prize as "a significant and dangerous iceberg in the sea of British culture that serves as a symbol of its current malaise".

In 1997, the decision to award Arundhati Roy's The God of Small Things proved controversial. Carmen Callil, chair of the previous year's Booker judges, called it an "execrable" book and said on television that it should not even have been on the shortlist. Booker Prize chairman Martyn Goff said Roy won because nobody objected, following the rejection by the judges of Bernard MacLaverty's shortlisted book due to their dismissal of him as "a wonderful short-story writer and that Grace Notes was three short stories strung together".

2000–present

Before 2001, each year's longlist of nominees was not publicly revealed. From 2001, the longlisted novels started to be published each year, and in 2007 the number of nominees was capped at 12 or 13 each year.

In 2001, A. L. Kennedy, who was a judge in 1996, called the prize "a pile of crooked nonsense" with the winner determined by "who knows who, who's sleeping with who, who's selling drugs to who, who's married to who, whose turn it is".

The Booker Prize created a permanent home for the archives from 1968 to present at Oxford Brookes University Library. The Archive, which encompasses the administrative history of the Prize from 1968 to date, collects together a diverse range of material, including correspondence, publicity material, copies of both the Longlists and the Shortlists, minutes of meetings, photographs and material relating to the awards dinner (letters of invitation, guest lists, seating plans). Embargoes of ten or twenty years apply to certain categories of material; examples include all material relating to the judging process and the Longlist prior to 2002.

Between 2005 and 2008, the Booker Prize alternated between writers from Ireland and India. "Outsider" John Banville began this trend in 2005 when his novel The Sea was selected as a surprise winner: Boyd Tonkin, literary editor of The Independent, famously condemned it as "possibly the most perverse decision in the history of the award" and rival novelist Tibor Fischer poured scorn on Banville's victory. Kiran Desai of India won in 2006. Anne Enright's 2007 victory came about due to a jury badly split over Ian McEwan's novel On Chesil Beach. The following year it was India's turn again, with Aravind Adiga narrowly defeating Enright's fellow Irishman Sebastian Barry.

Historically, the winner of the Booker Prize had been required to be a citizen of the Commonwealth of Nations, the Republic of Ireland, or Zimbabwe. It was announced on 18 September 2013 that future Booker Prize awards would consider authors from anywhere in the world, so long as their work was in English and published in the UK. This change proved controversial in literary circles. Former winner A. S. Byatt and former judge John Mullan said the prize risked diluting its identity, whereas former judge A. L. Kennedy welcomed the change. Following this expansion, the first winner not from the Commonwealth, Ireland, or Zimbabwe was American Paul Beatty in 2016. Another American, George Saunders, won the following year. In 2018, publishers sought to reverse the change, arguing that the inclusion of American writers would lead to homogenisation, reducing diversity and opportunities everywhere, including in America, to learn about "great books that haven't already been widely heralded".

Man Group announced in early 2019 that the year's prize would be the last of eighteen under their sponsorship. A new sponsor, Crankstart – a charitable foundation run by Sir Michael Moritz and his wife, Harriet Heyman – then announced it would sponsor the award for five years, with the option to renew for another five years. The award title was changed to simply "The Booker Prize".

In 2019, despite having been unequivocally warned against doing so, the foundation's jury – under the chair Peter Florence – split the prize, awarding it to two authors, in breach of a rule established in 1993. Florence justified the decision, saying: "We came down to a discussion with the director of the Booker Prize about the rules. And we were told quite firmly that the rules state that you can only have one winner ... and as we have managed the jury all the way through on the principle of consensus, our consensus was that it was our decision to flout the rules and divide this year’s prize to celebrate two winners." The two were British writer Bernardine Evaristo for her novel Girl, Woman, Other and Canadian writer Margaret Atwood for The Testaments. Evaristo's win marked the first time the Booker had been awarded to a black woman, while Atwood's win, at 79, made her the oldest winner.

Judging
The selection process for the winner of the prize commences with the formation of an advisory committee, which includes a writer, two publishers, a literary agent, a bookseller, a librarian, and a chairperson appointed by the Booker Prize Foundation. The advisory committee then selects the judging panel of five people, the membership of which changes each year, although on rare occasions a judge may be selected a second time. Judges are selected from amongst leading literary critics, writers, academics and leading public figures.

The Booker judging process and the very concept of a "best book" being chosen by a small number of literary insiders is controversial for many. The Guardian introduced the "Not the Booker Prize" voted for by readers partly as a reaction to this.
Author Amit Chaudhuri wrote: "The idea that a 'book of the year' can be assessed annually by a bunch of people – judges who have to read almost a book a day – is absurd, as is the idea that this is any way of honouring a writer."

The winner is usually announced at a formal dinner in London's Guildhall in early October. However, in 2020, with COVID-19 pandemic restrictions in place, the winner ceremony was broadcast in November from The Roundhouse, in partnership with the BBC.

Legacy of British Empire
Luke Strongman noted that the rules for the Booker prize as laid out in 1969 with recipients limited to novelists writing in English from Great Britain or nations that had once belonged to the British Empire strongly suggested the purpose of the prize was to deepen ties between the nations that had all been a part of the empire. The first book to win the Booker, Something to Answer For in 1969, concerned the misadventures of an Englishman in Egypt in the 1950s at the time when British influence in Egypt was ending. Strongman wrote that most of the books that have won the Booker Prize have in some way been concerned with the legacy of the British Empire, with many of the prize winners having engaged in imperial nostalgia. However, over time many of the books that won the prize have reflected the changed balance of power from the emergence of new identities in the former colonies of the empire, and with it "culture after the empire". The attempts of successive British officials to mould "the natives" into their image did not fully succeed, but did profoundly and permanently change the cultures of the colonised, a theme which some non-white winners of the Booker prize have engaged with in various ways.

Winners

Special awards
In 1993, to mark the prize's 25th anniversary, a "Booker of Bookers" Prize was given. Three previous judges of the award, Malcolm Bradbury, David Holloway and W. L. Webb, met and chose Salman Rushdie's Midnight's Children, the 1981 winner, as "the best novel out of all the winners".

In 2006, the Man Booker Prize set up a "Best of Beryl" prize, for the author Beryl Bainbridge, who had been nominated five times and yet failed to win once. The prize is said to count as a Booker Prize. The nominees were An Awfully Big Adventure, Every Man for Himself, The Bottle Factory Outing, The Dressmaker and Master Georgie, which won.

Similarly, The Best of the Booker was awarded in 2008 to celebrate the prize's 40th anniversary. A shortlist of six winners was chosen — Rushdie's Midnight's Children, Coetzee' Disgrace, Carey's Oscar and Lucinda, Gordimer's The Conservationist, Farrell's The Siege of Krishnapur, and Barker's The Ghost Road — and the decision was left to a public vote; the winner was again Midnight's Children.

In 1971, the nature of the prize was changed so that it was awarded to novels published in that year instead of in the previous year; therefore, no novel published in 1970 could win the Booker Prize. This was rectified in 2010 by the awarding of the "Lost Man Booker Prize" to J. G. Farrell's Troubles.

In 2018, to celebrate the 50th anniversary, the Golden Man Booker was awarded. One book from each decade was selected by a panel of judges: Naipaul's In a Free State (the 1971 winner), Lively's Moon Tiger (1987), Ondaatje's The English Patient (1992), Mantel's Wolf Hall (2009) and Saunders' Lincoln in the Bardo (2017). The winner, by popular vote, was The English Patient.

Nomination
Since 2014, each publisher's imprint may submit a number of titles based on their longlisting history (previously they could submit two). Non-longlisted publishers can submit one title, publishers with one or two longlisted books in the previous five years can submit two, publishers with three or four longlisted books are allowed three submissions, and publishers with five or more longlisted books can have four submissions.

In addition, previous winners of the prize are automatically considered if they enter new titles. Books may also be called in: publishers can make written representations to the judges to consider titles in addition to those already entered. In the 21st century the average number of books considered by the judges has been approximately 130.

Related awards for translated works
A separate prize for which any living writer in the world may qualify, the Man Booker International Prize was inaugurated in 2005. Until 2015, it was given every two years to a living author of any nationality for a body of work published in English or generally available in English translation. In 2016, the award was significantly reconfigured, and is now given annually to a single book in English translation, with a £50,000 prize for the winning title, shared equally between author and translator.

A Russian version of the Booker Prize was created in 1992 called the Booker-Open Russia Literary Prize, also known as the Russian Booker Prize. In 2007, Man Group plc established the Man Asian Literary Prize, an annual literary award given to the best novel by an Asian writer, either written in English or translated into English, and published in the previous calendar year.

As part of The Times Literature Festival in Cheltenham, a Booker event is held on the last Saturday of the festival. Four guest speakers/judges debate a shortlist of four books from a given year from before the introduction of the Booker prize, and a winner is chosen. Unlike the real Man Booker (1969 through 2014), writers from outside the Commonwealth are also considered. In 2008, the winner for 1948 was Alan Paton's Cry, the Beloved Country, beating Norman Mailer's The Naked and the Dead, Graham Greene's The Heart of the Matter and Evelyn Waugh's The Loved One. In 2015, the winner for 1915 was Ford Madox Ford's The Good Soldier, beating The Thirty-Nine Steps (John Buchan), Of Human Bondage (W. Somerset Maugham), Psmith, Journalist (P. G. Wodehouse) and The Voyage Out (Virginia Woolf).

See also

 International Booker Prize
 List of British literary awards
 List of literary awards
 Commonwealth Writers Prize
 Grand Prix of Literary Associations
 Costa Book Awards
 Prix Goncourt
 Governor General's Awards
 Scotiabank Giller Prize
 Miles Franklin Award
 Russian Booker Prize
 Samuel Johnson Prize (non-fiction)
 German Book Prize (Deutscher Buchpreis)

References

Further reading
 Lee, Hermione (1981). "The Booker Prize: Matters of judgment". The Times Literary Supplement, reprinted 22 October 2008.

External links

 
 The Booker Prize Archive at Oxford Brookes University
 A primer on the Man Booker Prize and critical review of literature
 Man Booker Prize 2013 Longlist announced 23 July 2013, updated with Shortlist 10 September 2013

 
1968 establishments in the United Kingdom
Awards established in 1968
British fiction awards
English-language literary awards
Booker authors' division
Oxford Brookes University